Microdrillia patricia is a species of sea snail, a marine gastropod mollusk in the family Borsoniidae.

Description
The small, claviform shell has a maximum length of 6 mm and a width of 2.1 mm. The protoconch contains at least 6 whorls and the teleoconch 5½ convex whorls. The protoconch has 15–16 axial ribs on its penultimate whorl and 21 to 24 ribs on its last whorl. The collabral threads are strong. On the base of the body whorl one can see 7 to 9 spiral lirae. The aperture is oblong. The siphonal canal is short.

Distribution
This marine species occurs from the Gulf of Oman to continental shelf of Western Transkei, South Africa

References

External links
 
  Bouchet P., Kantor Yu.I., Sysoev A. & Puillandre N. (2011) A new operational classification of the Conoidea. Journal of Molluscan Studies 77: 273–308

patricia
Gastropods described in 1904